Chengalpattu is a state assembly constituency in Kancheepuram district, Tamil Nadu, India. Its State Assembly Constituency number is 32. It comprises a portion of Chengalpattu taluk and is a part of the Kancheepuram constituency for national elections to the Parliament of India. It is one of the 234 State Legislative Assembly Constituencies in Tamil Nadu, in India.

The Vanniyar community is the majority community in this constituency with around 30% population.

The population of other communities are: Paraiyar 22%, All Vellala Mudhaliyars + Senguntha Mudhaliyars 15%, All kinds of Naidus 8%, Konar 7% and 5% Muslims.

Madras State

Tamil Nadu

Election results

2021

2016

2011

2006

2001

1996

1991

1989

1984

1980

1977

1971

1967

1962

1957

1952

References 

 

Assembly constituencies of Tamil Nadu
Chengalpattu district